Frédéric Rimbaud (7 October 1814 in Dole – 16 November 1878 in Dijon) was a French infantry officer. He served in the conquest of Algeria, the Crimean War and the Sardinian Campaign. He is best known as the father of the poet Arthur Rimbaud.

Biography
Rimbaud, a Burgundian of Provençal extraction, was a captain in the 47th Regiment of Infantry; he had risen from the ranks, and he had spent much of his service outside France. From 1844 to 1850, he participated in the conquest of Algeria and in 1854 was awarded the Légion d'honneur "by Imperial decree". Captain Rimbaud was described as "good-tempered, easy-going and generous". He had literary ambitions, had written guides for Arabic learners and had translated the Quran into French. (Rimbaud later used his father's material for his own Arabic studies.)

In October 1852, Rimbaud, then 38, was transferred to Mézières when he met his future wife, then 27, Marie Catherine Vitalie Cuif (10 March 1825 – 16 November 1907), while on a Sunday stroll. On 8 February 1853, they married. They had five children:
 Nicolas Frédéric ("Frédéric"), 2 November 1853 – 2 July 1911 
 Jean Nicolas Arthur ("Arthur"), born 20 October 1854
 Victorine-Pauline-Vitalie, born 4 June 1857 (she died a few weeks later)
 Jeanne-Rosalie-Vitalie ("Vitalie"), born 15 June 1858
 Frédérique Marie Isabelle ("Isabelle"), born 1 June 1860.
Though the marriage lasted seven years, Rimbaud lived continuously in the matrimonial home for less than three months, from February to May 1853. The rest of the time his military postings – including service in the Crimean War and the Sardinian Campaign (and earning medals for both) – meant he returned home to Charleville only when on leave. He was not at home for his children's births, nor their baptisms. After Isabelle's birth in 1860, Rimbaud never returned to the family home. After their separation, Mme. Rimbaud called herself "Widow Rimbaud".

Rimbaud left the army in 1864 and retired to Dijon, where he died 14 years later.

References
Notes

Sources

 This article began as a translation of its French equivalent.
 
 
 
 
 
 
 
 
 
 
 
 

1814 births
People from Dole, Jura
1878 deaths
Translators of the Quran into French
Chevaliers of the Légion d'honneur
French Army officers
Arthur Rimbaud